Darüşşafaka Basketbol (Darüşşafaka Basketball), commonly also known as Daçka Basketbol or simply Daçka, also known as Darüşşafaka Lassa for sponsorship reasons, is a professional basketball club that is based in Istanbul, Turkey. Darüşşafaka's basketball section, which was founded in 1914, is a part of Darüşşafaka Spor Kulübü (Darüşşafaka Sports Club) multi-sport club, which was founded in 1914. The club's basketball department is their most successful section. The club plays in the Turkish Basketball Super League. Its home arena for national domestic Turkish Super League games is the Darüşşafaka Ayhan Şahenk Sports Hall, with a seating capacity of 3,500, while its home arena for European-wide games is the Volkswagen Arena Istanbul, with a seating capacity of 5,240.

Daçka have won two Turkish Basketball Championships (in 1961 and 1962) over the course of their history. In European-wide competitions they have won the second tier level EuroCup, in the 2017–18 season, by defeating the Russian club Lokomotiv Kuban in the finals.

History
From 1993 until 2010, Darüşşafaka was a stable TBL (now called BSL) competitor. In the 2000–01 and 2001–02 seasons, the team took the third place in the regular season. In the 2009–10 season, the club ended up in 16th place in the TBL, and was relegated. The team was then a middle-tier team in the TB2L, from 2010 until 2013.

In 2013, Doğuş Holding became the main sponsor of the team, which instantly turned Darüşşafaka into a wealthy and ambitious club. In the 2013–14 season, they won the TB2L title, and were promoted to the TBL (now called BSL).

In the 2014–15 season, Darüşşafaka took the third place in the regular season, after some big names like Renaldas Seibutis and Jamon Gordon were signed for the season. Despite the huge expectations, the team lost in the quarterfinals of the league playoffs to Trabzonspor.

The team received a wild card for the 2015–16 EuroLeague season. Darüşşafaka started playing its EuroLeague home games at the Volkswagen Arena Istanbul, starting from November 2015. In September 2018, the club announced a new multi-year sponsorship deal with Tekfen, which changed the team's name sponsorship name to Darüşşafaka Tekfen.

Sponsorship naming
Due to sponsorship deals, Darüşşafaka have been also known as:

 Darüşşafaka (1992–2008)
 Darüşşafaka Cooper Tires (2008–2010)
 Darüşşafaka (2010–2013)
 Darüşşafaka Doğuş (2013–2017)
 Darüşşafaka (2017–2018)
 Darüşşafaka Tekfen (2018–2021) 
 Darüşşafaka (2021–2023)
 Darüşşafaka Lassa (2023–present)

Arenas
Darüşşafaka plays its national domestic Turkish Basketball Super League home games at the 3,500 seat Darüşşafaka Ayhan Şahenk Sports Hall. In November 2015, the 5,240 seat Volkswagen Arena Istanbul was officially inaugurated as the home arena of Darüşşafaka for EuroLeague home games.

Season by season

Source: Eurobasket.com

 Cancelled due to the COVID-19 pandemic in Europe.

Honours

European competitions
 EuroCup
 Winners (1): 2017–18

Domestic competitions
 Turkish Basketball Championship
 Winners (2): 1961, 1962
 Runners-up (1): 1960
 Turkish Cup
 Runners-up (3): 2002, 2016, 2020
 Turkish Basketball Second Division
 Winners (1): 2014
 Istanbul Basketball League (defunct)
 Winners (1): 1960
 Third place (3): 1961, 1962, 1963

Other competitions
 Sibenik, Croatia Invitational Game
 Winners (1): 2015
 Antalya, Turkey Invitational Game
 Winners (1): 2016
 Heimspiel Kranz Parkhotel Cup
 Winners (1): 2016
 Zadar Dogus Basketball Tournament
 Winners (1): 2016
 Casale Monferrat, Italy Invitational Game
 Winners (1): 2018
 Lumezzane, Italy Invitational Game
 Winners (1): 2018

Players

Current roster

Depth chart

Notable players

Head coaches

References

External links
  
 Darüşşafaka S.K. at bsl.org.tr 
 Darüşşafaka S.K. at eurobasket.com
 Darüşşafaka S.K. at euroleague.net 
 Darüşşafaka S.K. at tblstat.net

 
Basketball teams in Turkey
Basketball teams in Istanbul
Basketball teams established in 1914
1914 establishments in the Ottoman Empire
Sports teams in Istanbul